John Louis MacDonald (February 22, 1838 – July 13, 1903) was a United States representative from Minnesota and a member of the Democratic Party.

Early life
MacDonald was born February 22, 1838, in Glasgow, Scotland. He immigrated to Nova Scotia, Canada, with his parents. In 1847, the family settled in Pittsburgh, Pennsylvania. They again moved in 1855, to Minnesota, and settled in Scott County, where MacDonald studied law.

Legal career
MacDonald was admitted to the bar in 1859 and commenced practice at Belle Plaine, Minnesota. He served as a judge of the probate court of Scott County in 1860 and 1861. During the Civil War he was commissioned to enlist and muster volunteers for the Union Army. He also served as prosecuting attorney of Scott County in 1863 and 1864.

Political career
MacDonald served as county superintendent of schools in 1865 and 1866. He was elected to the Minnesota House of Representatives, serving in 1869 and 1870; and then served in the Minnesota Senate in 1871 and from 1873 to 1876.

He ran unsuccessfully candidate for attorney general in 1872 on the Democratic ticket. He was then elected mayor of Shakopee in 1876. He was elected judge of the eighth judicial district of Minnesota in 1876 for a term of seven years and reelected without opposition in 1883.

In 1886, he was elected as a Democrat to the 50th congress; he subsequently resigned as judge. He served in Congress from March 4, 1887, to March 3, 1889. He ran again in 1888, but lost. He subsequently returned to being a lawyer in Saint Paul, Minnesota. In 1898, he moved to Kansas City, Missouri, where he continued to practice law.

Death
MacDonald died from heart disease at his home in Kansas City on July 13, 1903. He was working as a lawyer until his death. He was buried at St. Mary's Cemetery in Kansas City.

References

 Minnesota Legislators Past and Present

1838 births
1903 deaths
19th-century American judges
19th-century American politicians
American prosecutors
School superintendents in Minnesota
Mayors of places in Minnesota
Democratic Party members of the Minnesota House of Representatives
Democratic Party Minnesota state senators
Minnesota state court judges
Missouri lawyers
Democratic Party members of the United States House of Representatives from Minnesota
Road incident deaths in Missouri
People from Shakopee, Minnesota
People from Belle Plaine, Minnesota
People of Minnesota in the American Civil War
Politicians from Glasgow
Union Army soldiers
American people of Scottish descent
Pre-Confederation Canadian emigrants to the United States
Scottish emigrants to pre-Confederation Nova Scotia
Probate court judges in the United States
19th-century American educators